Rajive Kumar (born 28 June 1958) is a retired 1981 batch Indian Administrative Service (IAS) officer belonging to the Uttar Pradesh cadre. Kumar is currently serving as the chairperson of the Uttar Pradesh Real Estate Regulatory Authority and previously served as the Chief Secretary of the Government of Uttar Pradesh, in addition to serving as Shipping Secretary of India.

Education 
Kumar holds a Master of Public Administration degree in public administration from Harvard Kennedy School at Harvard University, and a Master of Science degree in physics.

Career

Indian Administrative Service
Kumar has served in various key positions for both the Government of Uttar Pradesh and the Government of India, including as the Chief Secretary and Principal Resident Commissioner of Uttar Pradesh, divisional commissioner of Meerut, Saharanpur and Faizabad divisions, the managing director of Uttar Pradesh State Industrial Development Corporation, managing director of Uttar Pradesh State Mineral Corporation, executive director of Udyog Bandhu, Director (Revenue Intelligence) in the Department of Revenue, the district magistrate and collector of Mathura and Firozabad districts, and as the vice chairperson of the Mathura Development Authority in the Uttar Pradesh government, and as Union Road Transport and Highways Secretary, Union Shipping Secretary and as special secretary in the Ministry of Petroleum and Natural Gas, additional secretary in the Cabinet Secretariat, and as a joint secretary in the Department of Economic Affairs of the Ministry of Finance in the Indian government.

Shipping Secretary

Kumar was appointed as the Shipping Secretary of India by the Appointments Committee of the Cabinet (ACC) on 1 December 2014. He was given the additional charge of Ministry of Road Transport and Highways by the ACC on 10 May 2017. He demitted the offices on 27 June 2017, when his was repatriated to his state cadre by the Government of India, on the request of Uttar Pradesh government.

Chief Secretary of Uttar Pradesh 
After being repatriated to his state cadre by the Government of India on the request of the Government Uttar Pradesh on 20 June 2017, Kumar was appointed the Chief Secretary and Principal Resident Commissioner of Uttar Pradesh government by the Chief Minister of Uttar Pradesh on 29 June 2017.

Kumar demitted the office of chief secretary—and simultaneously superannuated from service—on 30 June 2018, serving as Uttar Pradesh's top bureaucrat for more than a year, and was succeeded by Anup Chandra Pandey. Kumar's tenure as chief secretary was generally considered successful.

Post-IAS 
After his retirement from the Indian Administrative Service, Kumar was nominated to become the Government of Uttar Pradesh as the first chairperson of the Uttar Pradesh Real Estate Regulatory Authority (UP RERA) in August 2018; Kumar was sworn-in as the chairperson of UP RERA by Uttar Pradesh governor, Ram Naik, on 9 August 2018.

References

External links 
 
 

Indian Administrative Service officers
Living people
Harvard Kennedy School alumni
1958 births
People from Bulandshahr
Chief Secretaries of Uttar Pradesh
District magistrate